Wilcox is a ghost town in northeastern Somervell County, Texas, near the present-day community of George's Creek.

History 
The town was named for William Cox, who settled along a nearby bend of the Brazos River in 1855. Soon after, more settlers followed, creating Wilcox. After the Civil War, the town's settlers moved to the community of George's Creek, where a church, a school, and many businesses.

References 

Unincorporated communities in Somervell County, Texas
Unincorporated communities in Texas